The Cumberland Group is a geologic group in Nova Scotia. It preserves fossils dating back to the Carboniferous period.

See also

 List of fossiliferous stratigraphic units in Nova Scotia

References
 

Carboniferous Nova Scotia